Ha Yong-jo or Hah Yong Jo (1946—2011) was the founding pastor of Onnuri Community Church in Seoul, South Korea.

Biography 
Born in 1946 in South Pyeongan Province (now, part of North Korea), Ha studied at Konkuk University and Presbyterian College and Theological Seminary in Seoul.

He brought together twelve families in 1984 to establish Onnuri Community Church. His approach was to model the church after the book of Acts, in what became known as the Acts 29 Vision, in building churches and sending out missionaries. By June 2010, Onnuri had sent 1,200 missionaries and maintained a membership of 75,000.

Ha Yong-jo battled liver cancer and died on August 2, 2011, in Seoul.

References 

1946 births
2011 deaths
South Korean Protestant ministers and clergy